Shafi Uddin Shafi is a Bangladeshi film director. As of December 2019 he directed 24 films.

Biography
Shafi's first direction Gaddari. It was released in 2003. At the beginning of his career he directed films along with Iqbal. Later, he started directing films individually.

Selected filmography
 Gaddari
 Tomar Jonyo Morte Pari
 Prem Mane Na Badha
 Machine Man
 Boro Vai Zindabad
 O Sathi Re
 Dhakar King
 Prem Prem Paglami
 Purno Doirgho Prem Kahini
 Bhalobasha Express
 Faad – The Trap
 Honeymoon
 Big Brother (2015)
 Warning (2015)
 Black Money (2015)
 Purno Doirgho Prem Kahini 2 (2016)
 Missed Call (2017)

References

External links

Living people
Bangladeshi film directors
Year of birth missing (living people)